Subliterature or trivialliteratur is popular writing and texts that are sometimes called literature but not so classified by literary critics. Subliterature is intrinsically considered inferior to literature in terms of writing skill, depth and legacy. Subliterature is considered to have little influence on future literature despite any popular or commercial success. Characteristics of subliterature share some aspects of pop music:
 Appeal to a general audience
 Tendency to reflect existing trends rather than progressive developments.

Examples of books considered subliterature
The Da Vinci Code
Twilight
Hush, Hush
Fifty Shades of Grey

Sources

Literature